Cabaret is a Canadian variety television series which aired on CBC Television in 1955.

Premise
This production's set resembled a nightclub where dancing and singing was featured. It was the first television variety series to be produced in Winnipeg. Host Marsh Phimister was joined by singers Maxine Ware and Ann MacLeod, by musician-dancer Del Wagner. The house band was the Mitch Parks Orchestra.

Scheduling
This half-hour series was broadcast in Montreal, Ottawa and Toronto on Thursdays at 8:00 p.m. (Eastern) from 8 September to 20 October 1955.

References

External links
 

CBC Television original programming
1955 Canadian television series debuts
1955 Canadian television series endings
Television shows filmed in Winnipeg